Mbunda may refer to:

 Mbunda Kingdom (c. 1500–1917)
 Mbunda language
 Mbunda people